A gay icon is a public figure who is regarded as a cultural icon by members of the LGBT community. Said figures usually have a devoted LGBT fanbase and have acted as allies to the LGBT community, often through their work. Alternatively, if they have not acted as allies, they have been "openly appreciative of their gay fanbase". Many gay icons also have a camp aesthetic style, which has been described as part of their appeal to LGBT individuals.

Most widely recognized gay icons tend to be celebrities—actresses and singers—who garnered large LGBT fanbases, such as Judy Garland, Madonna, Janet Jackson, or Cher. However, the label can and has also been applied to individuals in politics, sports, literature, and other mediums, as well as historical figures deemed relatable to LGBT causes. Prominent entertainers considered to be gay icons often incorporate themes of acceptance, self-love, and sexuality in their work. Gay icons of all orientations within the LGBTQ+ community have acknowledged the role that their gay fans have played in their success.

Variations and terminology
It has been argued that the gay icon label exists primarily for public figures held as cultural icons specifically by gay men. Other labels and variations include:
 Lesbian icon: A lesbian icon, also referred to as a dykon, is a figure that is regarded as an icon particularly by lesbians. The label has been applied to men such as James Dean and Marlon Brando for their influence on the butch aesthetic for lesbians. It has also been applied to various actresses who have played queer characters on film and television, such as Natasha Lyonne and Cate Blanchett.

Historical figures

Sappho of Lesbos
Sappho of Lesbos was an Archaic Greek poet known for composing sentimental lyrics about women. Perceived homoerotism in her poems have led to her becoming a symbol for lesbianism, with her name and home island inspiring the terms sapphic and lesbian respectively. Her sexuality, and the themes in her poetry have been extensively discussed and reinterpreted by scholars.

Saint Sebastian
The 3rd century Christian martyr Saint Sebastian is one of the earliest known gay icons, due to his depiction in artwork as a beautiful,  young man. Historian Richard A. Kaye states that "Contemporary gay men have seen in Sebastian at once a stunning advertisement for homosexual desire (indeed, a homoerotic ideal), and a prototypical portrait of a tortured closet case."

In the 1890s, Irish poet Oscar Wilde, himself also called a gay icon, was incarcerated and exiled for his sexuality, and adopted the pseudonym "Sebastian Melmoth" after the saint. Gay playwright Tennessee Williams used the saint's name for the martyred character Sebastian in his 1957 play, Suddenly Last Summer.

Marie Antoinette
While the rumors of Antoinette's sexuality were unfounded, they led to her being interpreted as an early lesbian icon in works by gay authors, such as Radclyffe Hall's The Well of Loneliness (1928) and Jean Genet's The Maids (1947).

Modern celebrities

Cher
Cher has been ranked in diverse listicles of the most prominent gay icons.

Mariah Carey

Mariah Carey has demonstrated allyship since the early beginnings of her career. She has shown her love for her LGBTQ+ fans numerous times, including a 2003 performance at G-A-Y in London. Furthermore, Carey also won a GLAAD award for Allyship.

Kate Bush

Kate Bush has been cited as an influence by respected artists like Sir Elton John, who is openly gay and credits Bush's music with helping him to overcome his alcoholism. Fellow gay icon Cher has also expressed admiration of Bush's work. Her debut single "Wuthering Heights" topped the charts and became a global success. The music video for the song in which she dances in the moors in a red dress has become iconic among the LGBTQ community. One of her less influential albums, Lionheart (1978), featured a song titled "Kashka From Baghdad", which regaled to the listener the tale of a gay couple living together in sin, which was quite revolutionary for its time. Since 2016, Kate Bush fans have gathered in locations all over the world and taken to recreate Bush's "Wuthering Heights" video in an event dubbed The Most Wuthering Heights Day Ever. Men and women in attendance to the event don red dresses or red in general and recreate the choreography observed in the video as a tribute. Bush, who has seen a clip of one of the events, described the tribute by her fans as "very touching and sweet".

Madonna

Pop musician Madonna has become a preeminent gay icon. The Advocates Steve Gdula commented that "back in the 1980s and even the early 1990s, the release of a new Madonna video or single was akin to a national holiday, at least among her gay fans." Gdula also stated that during this period, concurrent with the rise of the AIDS epidemic, "when other artists tried to distance themselves from the very audience that helped their stars to rise, Madonna only turned the light back on her gay fans and made it burn all the brighter."

Kylie Minogue
Kylie Minogue, known for her disco-infused dance music and camp style, is held in high esteem by her gay fans. She remarks that her gay fans have been with her 'through thick and thin', yet was never specifically marketed to a gay audience early in her career. Singer songwriter Rufus Wainwright described Minogue as 'the gay shorthand for joy'. She has performed at the Sydney Gay and Lesbian Mardi Gras Party in 1994, 1998 and 2012, Palm Springs White Party in 2018, WorldPride 2019 in New York City and headlined the opening ceremony concert at WorldPride 2023 in Sydney.

Janet Jackson

Janet Jackson garnered a substantial LGBT following during the 1990s with her sixth studio album The Velvet Rope (1997). The album was honored by the National Black Lesbian and Gay Leadership Forum and received the award for Outstanding Music Album at the 9th Annual GLAAD Media Awards in 1998 for its songs that dealt with sexual orientation and homophobia. On 26 April 2008, she received the Vanguard Award—a media award from the Gay & Lesbian Alliance Against Defamation—to honor her work in the entertainment industry in promoting equality for LGBT people.

GLAAD President Neil G. Giuliano commented, "Ms. Jackson has a tremendous following inside the LGBT community and out, and having her stand with us against the defamation that LGBT people still face in our country is extremely significant."

Ellen DeGeneres
Ellen DeGeneres is considered to be a gay icon for coming out publicly in a time when American culture was not as accepting, facing setbacks to her career and persevering to have an extremely successful daytime talk show.

Lady Gaga
Lady Gaga, who herself is bisexual, fought as an LGBT rights activist from the beginning of her career and has a large LGBT following. She is often referred to as one of the biggest contemporary gay icons and fought against LGBT-related phobias, for marriage and adoption equality, the repeal of the Don't Ask Don't Tell law, the protection of transgender people.

Katy Perry 
Out described Katy Perry as a gay icon. Perry dedicated the music video for "Firework" to the It Gets Better Project. Perry was additionally awarded the National Equality Award by the Human Rights Campaign.

Judy Garland

Late singer and actress Judy Garland was immensely popular among gay men due to her camp sensibilities, and is considered "the quintessential pre-Stonewall gay icon".

In the 1950s, the phrase "friend of Dorothy" became used as a slang term for homosexuals. This term is attributed both to well-known author and fellow gay icon Dorothy Parker, and to Garland's prominent role as Dorothy Gale in The Wizard of Oz.

Diana, Princess of Wales
Highly regarded by the LGBT community due to her work with gay men suffering from AIDS, Diana, Princess of Wales, is considered to be a gay icon. The hardships she faced during her life within the British royal family and her struggles with bulimia have been cited as factors to which members of the LGBT community can mostly connect. Writing for Them, David Levesley described Diana as "a symbol of the familial oppression many queer people know all too well," and added that "[queer people] admire her for how long she lasted in the face of a shitty situation. Is there anything more queer than a fabulous woman trapped in a bleak household?" James Greig from Vice also held a similar viewpoint, stating that "her status as a tragic diva aside, it's undeniable that Diana made real, material changes to the lives of LGBT people – particularly through the work she did around AIDS." In an article for Newsweek, Desmond O'Connor wrote that Diana's work with dying HIV+ gay men was crucial for reminding "the people of Great Britain that their 'untouchable' sons deserved to be loved."

In 2009, a panel including Sir Ian McKellen and Alan Hollinghurst chose Diana's portrait to be shown in the Gay Icons exhibition at the National Portrait Gallery, London. In October 2017, the Attitude magazine honoured Diana with its Legacy Award for her HIV/AIDS work. Prince Harry accepted the award on behalf of his mother.

Elton John 
Sir Elton Hercules John, famously known as Elton John, is perhaps one of the most famous, publicly queer musicians of all time. During 1976, he announced publicly that he was bisexual and remained open about his sexuality to present day, happily married to his husband David Furnish since 2014. Aside from his musical career, he is also the founder of the Elton John AIDS Foundation which was created to give support and aide to those in need as well as to "prevent infections, fight stigma and provide treatment with love, compassion and dignity for the most vulnerable groups affected by HIV around the world".

Lea Salonga 

Lea Salonga is a Filipina singer, actress, and columnist who rose to international recognition for originating the role of Kim in the original West End and Broadway productions of Miss Saigon and becoming the first Asian actress to win a Tony Award. She has actively supported the LGBT community for many years. In 2011, The Advocate called her a "major gay icon" for being "very vocal in her support for LGBT equality, both here and in her native Philippines."

The song "Reflection," which she sang in Disney's Mulan (1998), has become viewed as an anthem for queer audiences. On 12 October 2009, during a benefit concert held at The Philippine Center's Kalayaan Hall for the victims of Typhoon Ondoy, Salonga referenced the National Equality March in Washington, D.C. and stated, "I believe that every single human being has the fundamental right to marry whoever they want."

Fictional characters

Wonder Woman

He-Man

Since his creation, He-Man's homoeroticism, implied homosexuality, and adherence to multiple gay stereotypes has resulted in the character and show drawing a queer audience when the cartoon first aired, with the character being viewed as a gay icon.

Wolverine

Although Wolverine has primarily been depicted as straight in mainstream Marvel continuity, his relationships with male characters like Cyclops and Nightcrawlers have been highlighted for homoerotic elements. An alternate version of Wolverine featured in X-Treme X-Men (2012 – 2013) was depicted as gay and in a relationship with Hercules, two characters sharing an on-panel kiss in issue #10. The character has proven popular with queer fans, and has been described as a gay icon.

Satire
Multiple characters and celebrities have been hailed as gay icons through tongue-in-cheek internet memes. Several of these characters have been leading antagonists from horror films, such as Ma, Annabelle, The Babadook, Jafar, M3GAN and Pennywise.

Responses

Many celebrities have responded positively to being regarded as gay icons, several noting the loyalty of their gay fans. Eartha Kitt and Cher have credited gay fans with keeping them going at times when their careers had faltered.

Kylie Minogue has acknowledged the perception of herself as a gay icon and has performed at such events as the Sydney Gay and Lesbian Mardi Gras. Asked to explain the reason for her large gay fanbase, Minogue replied, "It's always difficult for me to give the definitive answer because I don't have it. My gay audience has been with me from the beginning ... they kind of adopted me." She noted that she differed from many gay icons who were seen as tragic figures, with the comment, "I've had a lot of tragic hairdos and outfits. I think that makes up for it!"

Lady Gaga has acknowledged and credited her gay following for launching then supporting her career stating, among other examples, "When I started in the mainstream it was the gays that lifted me up", and that "because of the gay community I'm where I am today." As a way to thank her gay audience for allowing her to perform her first album in gay clubs before she was invited to perform at straight ones, she often debuted her new albums at gay clubs. Along her career, she also dedicated a MuchMusic Video Award win, as well as her Alejandro music video, to gay people, frequently praised her gay entourage for the positive impact they had on her life and often gave a place to different queer crowds in her songs, performances, music videos as well as in the visuals of her make up line. Lady Gaga is known for her fights as an LGBT activist and attended numerous LGBT events such as Prides and Stonewall day.

Madonna has acknowledged and embraced her gay following throughout her career, even making several references to the gay community in her songs or performances, and performed at several gay clubs. She has declared in interviews that some of her best friends are gay and that she adores gay people and refers to herself as "the biggest gay icon of all times." She also has been quoted in television interviews in the early 1990s as declaring the "big problem in America at the time was homophobia."

Geri Halliwell has consistently acknowledged and accepted her status as a gay icon throughout her career as both a solo artist and member of the Spice Girls, describing a "kinship" with the gay community and her love and respect for her LGBTQ fans.

In August 2020, Lea Salonga responded to her gay icon tag, saying, "I’m not actually sure how I am." In the same interview, she continued, "Is it that I stand up for gay rights? Is it that I have siblings, cousins who are also members of the LGBT community?" She has also acknowledged the LGBT presence in musical theatre and stated that she has worked closely with members of the LGBT community for her entire career. In September 2022, after playing the role of queer mom Elodie Honrada on HBO Max's Pretty Little Liars: Original Sin, she told The Advocate Channel that "if there is someone for whom this really resonates, and see these characters and go 'Oh my gosh, that's me, and I'm not treated as a joke,' it's great."

See also
 Queer art
 New Queer Cinema
 Lists of LGBT people
 Straight ally

References

Books

 Gay Icons: The (Mostly) Female Entertainers Gay Men Love, Georges-Claude Guilbert (2018).  
 The Culture of Queers, Richard Dyer (2002). 
 Frightening the Horses: Gay Icons of the Cinema, Eric Braun (2002). 
 20th Century Icons-Gay, Graham Norton (2001). 
 Gay histories and cultures, George E. Haggerty (2000).

External links
 GLBT Historical Society
 Christina up close
 Sophie Morris. From the tragic to the bland // New Statesman, August 1, 2005
 "Pink doesn't mean fluffy" John Howard. The Independent, (UK), 4 August 2005
 French Gay Icons: Ysa Ferrer
 Lil Nas X wants to 'open doors' for 'other queer people to simply exist'
 Eltonjohn AIDS foundation

LGBT culture
LGBT history